Heavy: An American Memoir is a memoir by Kiese Laymon, published October 16, 2018 by Scribner. In 2019, the book won the Carnegie Medal for Nonfiction and Los Angeles Times Book Prize, among other awards and nominations.

Reception 
Heavy received rave reviews from Kirkus Reviews, Publishers Weekly, Booklist, NPR, The New York Times Book Review, The Atlantic, Los Angeles Times, The New Republic, San Francisco Chronicle, TIME, Entertainment Weekly, and Library Journal.

In reviews, the books was called "harrowing," "gorgeous," "spectacular," "dynamic," and "unsettling in all the best ways." In her review for Booklist, Anne Bostrom said the book was "[s]o artfully crafted, miraculously personal, and continuously disarming," that it is, "at its essence, powerful writing about the power of writing." Writing for the New York Times, Jennifer Szaili wrote, "This generous, searching book explores all the forces that can stop even the most buoyant hopes from ever leaving the ground.” The Los Angeles Times's Nathan Deuel said, "Heavy is one of the most important and intense books of the year because of the unyielding, profoundly original and utterly heartbreaking way it addresses and undermines expectations for what exactly it’s like to possess and make use of a male black body in America."

The Guardian's Sukhdev Sandhu provided a mixed review, saying "he's best when writing about his own feelings." Sandhu continued, "Laymon's prose can be erratic, lurching between showy 'y'alls' and academese such as 'modes of memory'. There are many sententious and underdeveloped proclamations." Near the end of the book, Sandhu noted that Laymon "sounds merely pompous." Sandhu also found the way the book addressed Laymon's mother using the second-person pronoun "you" to be "[s]trangest of all" the language used in the book, saying, "It comes across as a device, as a contrivance. It promises an intimacy that he never delivers on."

Heavy was named one of the best nonfiction of 2018 by Kirkus Reviews, The New York Times, Publishers Weekly, NPR, Buzzfeed, and Boston Public Library. Library Journal named it one of the best memoirs of the year. Entertainment Weekly and Southern Living included it in their overall list of the best books of the year, and The Chicago Public Library placed it in the top ten books of the year. The New York Times included it in their list of the best 50 memoirs of the past 50 years.

References 

2018 non-fiction books
Novels set in Mississippi
Charles Scribner's Sons books
Bloomsbury Publishing books